Paraschistura alepidota is a species of stone loach found in the Madyan River in Pakistan and the Indus River in China.

References

alepidota
Fish of Asia
Fish of China
Fish described in 1970
Taxa named by Petre Mihai Bănărescu